Laurens is an affluent neighborhood in Alexandria. The neighborhood mainly consisted of villas, which are now gradually being demolished to make room for apartment towers.

Neighbourhoods of Alexandria
Upper class